Syangja District, a part of Gandaki Province, is one of the seventy-seven districts of Nepal. It lies at about latitude 28°4'60 North and longitude 83°52'0 East.

The district now has five municipalities Waling, Putalibazar, Chapakot, Bhirkot and Galyang and six rural municipalities Aandhikhola, Arjun Chaupari, Biruwa, Phedikhola, Harinas and Kaligandaki

Syangja in 1994 under the auspices of the South Asia Poverty Alleviation Program (SAPAP) of the UNDP, received million of dollars of international investment and has become a model for national development. Syangja's model has proved so successful that the Government of Nepal joined forces with the SAPAP to extend the project to other districts and make it a model for national development. It has been initiated or implemented in at least 200 Village Development Councils (VDC/s) of 45 districts of Nepal.

People of many ethnicities live in this district. The major groups are Brahmin, Chetri, Gurung and Magar.

Kali Gandaki A Hydropower is the largest hydropower plant of the nation located on the Kali Gandaki river in Kaligandaki Gaunpalika. It has the maximum plant capacity of 144 MW. Largest and developed city Waling

People and places
Many different ethnicity of people live in this district. The major groups consisting of Brahmin, Kshetri, Gurung, Magar and others. Brahmin and Chhetri (Kshetriya) are renowned by their representation in the governmental jobs and Indian army respectively. Gurungs and Magars are known for their involvement in British Army Gurkhas and Military of India. There is a popular saying that "when you go to Syangja and hit randomly a house with a stone that house surely belongs to Section-Officer".

The headquarters of Syanga district lies at Syangja bazaar. Some places of historical interest in this district are Satahun Chandi, Manakamana, Bhirkot Durbar, Alamdevi, Gahraukalika, Nuwakot Durbar, Chhangchhangdi and Ridi Ruru Kshetra on the banks of Kaligandaki river. Chhangchhangdi (Chaya-kshetra) is mentioned in the Swasthani Vrata-Katha, considered to be a part of the Skanda Purana, as the place where the last organ of dead Satidevi fell when she was being carried by Lord Shiva. Among the three municipalities, Putalibazar municipality lies in the eastern side whereas Waling municipality in the western Syangja, the newly formed Chapakot municipality is on the east-south. Waling is a longitudinal valley along the banks of the Aandhikhola river. According to one folk legend, Aandhikhola river is believed to be originated from the tears of Shravan of the Ramayana. The largest valley in Syangja is Ramkosh. There are places to hike including Chandithaan which is Devi temple and Hunikot a viewpoint over Putalibazar.

Political division
Syangja district has 11 local units among them five are municipalities (Nagarpalika) and six rural municipalities (guanpalika) recently with the formulation of new constitution and provincial division of the country.
 Galyang Municipality
 Chapakot Municipality
 Putalibazar Municipality
 Bheerkot Municipality
 Waling Municipality
 Arjun Chaupari Rural Municipality
 Aandhikhola Rural Municipality
 Kaligandaki Rural Municipality
 Phedikhola Rural Municipality
 Harinas Rural Municipality
 Biruwa Rural Municipality

Former Village Development Committees and municipalities

Alamdevi
Arjun Chaupari
Aruchaur
Arukharka
Bangephadke
Bahakot
Banethok Deurali
Bhatkhola
Bhirkot Municipality
Bichari Chautara
Birgha Archale
Biruwa Archale
Chandi Bhanjyang
Chapakot Municipality
Chhangchhangdi
Chilaunebas
Chinnebas
Chisapani
Chitre Bhanjyang
Darsing Dahathum
Dhapuk Simal Bhanjyang
Iladi
Jagat Bhanjyang
Jagatradevi
Kalikakot
Kolma Barahachaur
Keware Bhanjyang
Khilung Deurali
Kichnas
Kyakami
Majhakot Sivalaya
Malengkot
Malunga Tunibot
Manakamana
Nibuwakharka
Oraste
Pakbadi
Panchamul
Pauwegaude
Pelakot
Pelkachaur
Phaparthum
Phedikhola
Pindikhola
Putalibazar Municipality
Rangvang
Rapakot
Ratnapur
Sankhar
Daraun
Sirsekot Kaule
Sekham
Setidobhan
Srikrishna Gandaki
Sirsekot
Sorek
Taksar
Thuladihi
Thumpokhara
Tindobate
Tulsibhanjyang
Waling Municipality
Wangsing Deurali
Yaladi

Municipalities
Waling Municipality (formed from former Dhanubase, Pekhu and Walling VDCs)
Putalibazar Municipality (formed from former Putalibazar, Satupasal, Chandikalika, Ganeshpur and Karendanda VDCs)
Chapakot Municipality (formed from former Chapakot, Kuwakot and Ratnapur VDCs)
Bhirkot Municipality (formed from former Bayarghari, Dahathum VDCs)

Road connection
Syangja was connected to Pokhara and Bhairahawa, two of the most prominent cities of Western Nepal, after the construction of the Siddhartha Highway. The highway enters this district in the North from Kubhinde and leaves in the South to Ramdi of Palpa district.

Hydroelectricity
The Kaligandaki A Hydroelectric Power Station built on the Kali Gandaki River is the largest hydroelectric project in Nepal, with an installed capacity of 144 MW. Besides the Kaligandaki A, Aadhikhola hydroelectric and some other, smaller, hydroelectric projects have been started in this district.

Of all the districts in Nepal, Syangja is one of the few districts in the country that does not suffer from the problem of loadshedding, or scheduled electric outages, while the nation suffers hours of loadshedding each day.

Geography and climate

Demographics

At the time of the 2011 Nepal census, Syangja District had a population of 289,148.

As first language, 74.4% spoke Nepali, 15.1% Magar, 7.8% Gurung, 1.7% Newari, 0.3% Urdu, 0.2% Bhujel, 0.1% Bhojpuri, 0.1% Maithili and 0.1% other languages as their first language.

Ethnicity/caste: 30.9% were Hill Brahmin, 21.5% Magar, 11.5% Chhetri, 9.0% Gurung, 8.0% Kami, 4.0% Sarki, 3.7% Damai/Dholi, 3.3% Newar, 2.5% Thakuri, 2.4% Gharti/Bhujel, 0.7% Musalman, 0.6% Kumal, 0.6% Sanyasi/Dasnami, 0.3% Majhi, 0.2% Khawas, 0.1% Badi, 0.1% Bote, 0.1% Rai, 0.1% Tamang, 0.1% other Terai, 0.1% Tharu and 0.2% others.

Religion: 90.2% were Hindu, 7.4% Buddhist, 1.3% Bon, 0.7% Muslim, 0.2% Christian and 0.2% others.

Literacy: 76.5% could read and write, 1.6% could only read and 21.8% could neither read nor write.

2015 Nepal earthquake 
The district was affected by an earthquake on 25 April 2015. At least one house was destroyed.

References

External links

Nepal Population Report - 2011
A Digital Home for Syangja & Syangjali

 
Districts of Nepal established in 1962
Districts of Gandaki Province